Daniel Effiong (born 17 June 1972 in Calabar) is a retired male sprinter from Nigeria.

He became African 100 metres and Universiade champion in 1993. Together with Innocent Asonze, Francis Obikwelu and Deji Aliu he won a bronze medal in 4 x 100 metres relay at the 1999 World Championships, but the team was later disqualified (in August 2005) because Innocent Asonze failed a doping test in June 1999.

In 100 metres his personal best time was 9.98 seconds, achieved in the semifinal of the 1993 World Championships. This ranks him sixth in Nigeria, behind Olusoji Fasuba, Davidson Ezinwa, Olapade Adeniken, Francis Obikwelu and Uchenna Emedolu.

In 200 metres his personal best time was 20.10 seconds, achieved in May 1994 in Mount Sac. This ranks him second in Nigeria, only behind Francis Obikwelu, and fourth in Africa, behind Frankie Fredericks, Obikwelu and Stéphan Buckland.

He missed the 1995 World Championships in Athletics due to a failed drug test at the Nigerian Championships, where he tested positive for methyltestosterone and ephedrine. He received a four-year ban from the sport.

Achievements

See also
 List of doping cases in athletics

References

External links

1972 births
Living people
Nigerian male sprinters
Athletes (track and field) at the 1994 Commonwealth Games
Commonwealth Games bronze medallists for Nigeria
Sportspeople from Lagos
Doping cases in athletics
Nigerian sportspeople in doping cases
Commonwealth Games medallists in athletics
African Games gold medalists for Nigeria
African Games medalists in athletics (track and field)
Universiade medalists in athletics (track and field)
African Games bronze medalists for Nigeria
Athletes (track and field) at the 1999 All-Africa Games
Universiade gold medalists for Nigeria
Universiade silver medalists for Nigeria
Medalists at the 1993 Summer Universiade
20th-century Nigerian people
Medallists at the 1994 Commonwealth Games